"Crash" is a song by the Irish alternative rock sestet, Royseven, found on their debut album, The Art of Insincerity. The song was released as their debut single in Germany in January 2007 and in Ireland as their fourth single on September 14, 2007.

Live performances 
"Crash" is regarded as one of their best songs by fans and is eagerly anticipated at live performances. One such performance was on The Cafe on 15 March 2007.

References

External links
 Official band website
 Royseven MySpace
 Tour Dates for "Crash"

2007 singles
Royseven songs
2007 songs
Universal Records singles